A whiffenpoof was a tool for training Boy Scouts in tracking skills. The whiffenpoof itself was a small log, about the size of a stick of firewood, with nails driven into it on all sides, so that it bristled with nails. This was dragged through the forest on a short leash, by the older Scouts who were training the younger. It might thus create a track that the tenderfoot must learn to trace out. Or it might, alternately, be dragged across a trail in order to confuse the trackers. The fewer nails that were driven into it, the more difficult and subtle was the effect.

Thus it is that the word whiffenpoof can also refer to an imaginary or indefinite animal; e.g. "the great-horned whiffenpoof". It originates from actor Joseph Cawthorn's ad-lib in a 1908 performance of the operetta Little Nemo. He was told to stall for time while something was corrected backstage. In the scene, his character described imaginary prey he had hunted, so he created the "water-dwelling, food-gobbling" whiffenpoof on the spot. Yale students in the audience appropriated it for the name of their singing society.

Imaginary or indefinite animal
Particularly among hunters, "whiffenpoof" can be a tongue-in-cheek name for imaginary animal like the jackalope, or a placeholder name for an animal (analogous to "thingamajig"):

"Whiffenpoof" has been used as a joking fictitious name for a member of the upper crust; a 1922 Philadelphia newspaper columnist writes of an opera performance attended by "Mrs. T. Whiffenpoof Oscarbilt, Mr. and Mrs. Dudbadubb Dodo and [their] three dashing daughters who have just finished a term at Mrs. Pettiduck's School for Incorrigibles at Woodfern-by-the-Sea."

See also
Woofen-poof, a fictional bird

References

Placeholder names